Local storage may refer to:

 Hard disk drive, a data storage device used for storing and retrieving digital information using one or more rigid rapidly rotating disks (platters) coated with magnetic material.
 Local shared object, commonly called Flash cookies (due to their similarities with HTTP cookies), are pieces of data that websites which use Adobe Flash may store on a user's computer.
 Scratchpad memory
 Solid state drive which uses integrated circuit assemblies as memory to store data persistently.
 Web storage#Local and session storage, data placed in local storage is per origin and persists after the browser is closed.

See also 
 
 Thread-local storage